Men's Football at the 1999 South Asian Games was held in Kathmandu, Nepal from September 25 to October 4, 1999.

Fixtures and results
Accurate as of 4 October 1999.

Group A

Group B

Knockout round

Semi finals

Bronze medal match

Gold medal match

Winner

Goalscorers

7 Goals
 I. M. Vijayan

4 Goal
 Hari Khadka

3 Goals
 Jules C. Dias Alberto
 Haroon Yousaf

2 Goals
 Jewel Rana
 Mausoom Abdul Ghafoor
 Syed Sabir Pasha
Naresh Joshi
 Basanta Thapa
 Ali Shiham
 Gohar Zaman

1 Goal
 Shahajuddin Tipu
 Alfaz Ahmed
 Demish Chhetri
 Hardeep Singh
 Majeeb Moolanchikkal
 Raman Vijayan
 Adam Abdul Latheef
 Ibrahim Abdullah
 Muhammad Ibrahim
 Mohammed Mizam
 Bal Gopal Maharjan
 Deepak Amatya
 Rajan Rayamajhi

Own Goal
  ? (playing against )

References

External links
 RSSSF - 8th South Asian Federation Games 1999 (Kathmandu, Nepal)

1999 South Asian Games
1999 South Asian Games